Kinderlou is an unincorporated community in Lowndes County, in the U.S. state of Georgia.

History
A post office called Kinderlou was established in 1901, and remained in operation until 1933. The community was named after the sister of a local landowner.

References

Unincorporated communities in Lowndes County, Georgia